Glentworth is a village and civil parish in the West Lindsey district of Lincolnshire, England. The population of the parish (including Caenby Corner) was 323 at the 2011 census.

The name Glentworth comes from the Old English glente+worth or heopa+hamm for "enclosure frequented by birds of prey". In the Domesday Book it is noted as "Glentewrde".

The Church of England parish church of Saint Michael dates from three periods, as shown by the varied masonry of its outside walls. The oldest part is the Anglo-Saxon tower. The middle section of the present church is the product of Georgian and Victorian rebuilding. Its eastern end, with its rougher stonework, is largely Elizabethan.

Glentworth is the site of Glentworth Hall, an Elizabethan country house built by Christopher Wray.

Villagers construct scarecrows for an annual themed 'Glentworth Scarecrows' competition event.

References

Further reading
Foster, James Rex, MA; A History of Glentworth, 4th edition. Rectory Press 2005, reprinted 2011
Foster, James; Lincolnshire Past & Present, Society For Lincolnshire History & Archaeology, Winter 2010-11 and Spring 2011 editions: two-part article on the 1556 and 1753 halls at Glentworth.

External links

"Glentworth", Genuki.org.uk. Retrieved 11 December 2011

Villages in Lincolnshire
Civil parishes in Lincolnshire
West Lindsey District